Levant Mine and Beam Engine is a National Trust property at Trewellard, Pendeen, near St Just, Cornwall, England, UK. Its main attraction is that it has the world's only Cornish beam engine still operated by steam on its original site. There is also a visitor centre, a short underground tour, and the  South West Coast Path leads to Botallack Mine, via a cliff-top footpath. 

In 1919 the engine used to transport men between the different levels of the mine failed, leading to the deaths of thirty-one men. Since 2006, the area has been part of the UNESCO World Heritage Site, Cornwall and West Devon Mining Landscape.

Site

The property is on the site of the former Levant Mine, established in 1820 and closed in 1930, where tin and copper ores were raised. The mine reached a depth of about 600 metres. It got the nickname "mine under the sea", because tunnels were driven up to 2.5 km from the cliffs under the sea. The surviving beam engine was built  by Harvey's of Hayle.

History
The mine yields both copper and tin and was opened in 1820 with twenty shares of £20 each. From first opening, to circa 1883, the mine gave a profit of £171,000 from approximately £1,300,000 worth of ore. In 1882 the mine was taken over by new owners on a 21 year lease, replaced machinery and improved the surface-works. 

In 1883 three shafts were open. One shaft is occupied by the man-engine, a second by a pumping-engine and the third for hauling out the skips. Since the introductions of skips, for bringing ore to the surface, two shafts were abandoned. There was six engines on site,
 pumping-engine,  cylinder – pumps water from the mine
 stamping,  cylinder – breaks up the ore
 winding-engine or whim,  cylinder – raises the ore to the surface
 man-engine,  cylinder
 crushing-machine,  cylinder 
 winding-engine,  cylinder.

A description of the working conditions of the mine was described in The Cornishman newspaper in 1883. Around 366 men, boys, and girls were employed compared with about 600 prior to 1882. The mine was worked in three, eight-hour shifts, (except on Sunday) with fifty to sixty men working underground in each shift. The men were all more or less working in a nude state and sweating profusely. They were provided with spring water which was stored in huge canteens. Few are able to work underground after the age of 35. Thus a quantity of hard rock on each side of the lode has to be cut away at great expense. The levels are expanded by explosives. Premature ignition causes many injuries and fatalities. A  cylinder engine raised the ore to the surface in skips on two parallel inclines, one ascending as the other was lowered.

On 20 October 1919 an accident occurred when a metal bracket at the top of a rod broke on the man engine. The miners step on to a ladder, are transported  up or down, climb off on to a sollar, step back on to the ladder, repeating the process. The rod broke in several pieces and heavy timbers crashed down the shaft, some of which were carrying more than a hundred miners to the surface; killing thirty-one. The engine was not replaced and the lower levels of the mine were abandoned.

Minerals and ores
 silver
 bismuth
 calcspar
 aragonite
 vitreous copper ore or grey sulphuret of copper

See also

 Man engine for an account of the accident in the mine on 20 October 1919.
 Geevor Tin Mine, just to the northeast of the Levant complex.

References

External links

 Levant Mine and Beam Engine information at the National Trust
 Cornwall Record Office Online Catalogue for Levant
 Levant Mine Self-guided trail
 

Copper mines in Cornwall
Grade II listed buildings in Cornwall
Grade II listed industrial buildings
Industrial archaeological sites in Cornwall
Mining equipment
Mining museums in Cornwall
National Trust properties in Cornwall
1919 disasters in the United Kingdom
Preserved beam engines
St Just in Penwith
Steam museums in England
Tin mines in Cornwall